The seventh and originally final season of Futurama consisted of 26 episodes split equally across two broadcast seasons: 7-A and 7-B. It premiered on Comedy Central on June 20, 2012. A box set containing the 13 episodes of Season 7-A was released as Futurama: Volume 7 and another box set containing the 13 episodes of Season 7-B was released as Futurama: Volume 8.

On April 22, 2013, Comedy Central announced that season 7 would serve as the final season of the series. The final episode aired on September 4, 2013. Although it was intended as the final season initially, Hulu greenlit a Season 8 in February 2022, which will be scheduled to premiere in 2023.

Episodes

Comedy Central chose to air some parts of season 7 out of production order. This list is depicted in production order as this is the order used in Volume 7 and Volume 8 and intended by the producers. According to the commentaries in Volume 7, "31st Century Fox" (7ACV11) and "Viva Mars Vegas" (7ACV12) were aired out of the intended production order because Comedy Central wanted to advertise Patrick Stewart being in the broadcast season finale.

Home media

References

External links 
 Season 7 on the Infosphere.

Futurama lists
2012 American television seasons
2013 American television seasons
 
Futurama seasons
Split television seasons